The 49th Scripps National Spelling Bee was held in Washington, D.C. at the Mayflower Hotel on June 9–10, 1976, sponsored by the E.W. Scripps Company.

The winner was 13-year-old Tim Kneale of Nedrow, New York, winning on the word "narcolepsy" in the 21st round. Second place went to 13-year-old Rachel Wachtel of Wooster, Ohio, who missed "yarborough". Both missed "emmetropia" and "chorography" in prior rounds before "yarborough" was used. Third place was captured by 13-year-old William Mulhern of Marysville, Kansas, who fell on "balletomane".

The correct words spelled by Kneale also included: fatigue, conceit, opalescent, carafe, egalitarian, supernumerary, persiflage, literati, aphotic, bellipotent, physiolatry, demulcent, hagiology, and sauerbraten.

A record 87 contestants participated this year, up from 79 in 1975 and 80 in 1974. There were 49 girls and 38 boys ranging in age from 10 to 14. There were two repeat spellers, both from the prior year, the smallest number since 1970. Sixty were eliminated in the first day of competition. 525 total words were used this year.

John Paola, who finished 22nd, would go on to win the next year.

References

Scripps National Spelling Bee competitions
Scripps National Spelling Bee
Scripps National Spelling Bee
Scripps National Spelling Bee